Philip Gameli Awuku (born 27 April 2000) is a Ghanaian professional footballer who plays as a centre-back for Yeni Malatyaspor.

Career
Awuku began his career with the Ghanaian club Planners Athletic Club, and transferred to the Turkish club Yeni Malatyaspor on 1 February 2021. He made his professional debut with Yeni Malatyaspor in a 5–1 Süper Lig loss to Trabzonspor on 16 August 2021.

References

External links
 

2000 births
Living people
Footballers from Accra
Ghanaian footballers
Yeni Malatyaspor footballers
Süper Lig players
Association football defenders
Ghanaian expatriate footballers
Ghanaian expatriate sportspeople in Turkey
Expatriate footballers in Turkey